Band and Battalion of the U.S. Indian School is a silent film documentary made on April 30, 1901 by American Mutoscope and Biograph Company made in Carlisle, Pennsylvania, USA. The cinematographer was Arthur Marvin. It depicts a parade drill by the cadet corps of the American Indian School which includes many representatives of the Native American tribes in the United States. The head of the parade was the renowned  Carlisle Band  of the Carlisle Indian Industrial School.  In 1902 Marvin produced another documentary, Club Swinging at Carlisle Indian School for AM&B.

See also
American Mutoscope and Biograph Company
Silent films

References

External links

1901 films
American silent short films
American black-and-white films
Black-and-white documentary films
American short documentary films
Documentary films about Native Americans
Carlisle Indian Industrial School
1900s short documentary films
1900s American films